Cossington railway station was a station at Cossington on the Bridgwater branch of the Somerset and Dorset Joint Railway, built to  link the line at Edington with Bridgwater.

Opened on 21 July 1890 by the Bridgwater Railway Company, it was located to the north of the village, and consisted of a single platform with a stone building and a siding. This was controlled from a ground frame, the hut from which is now on the East Somerset Railway.

The station closed when the service was withdrawn on 1 December 1952. Station Road leads to the former station site.

References

External links
https://web.archive.org/web/20090107033220/http://www.sdjr.net/locations/cossington.html
 Station on navigable O.S. map

Disused railway stations in Somerset
Former Somerset and Dorset Joint Railway stations
Railway stations in Great Britain opened in 1890
Railway stations in Great Britain closed in 1952